The 1918 Case Scientists football team represented the Case School of Applied Science, now a part of Case Western Reserve University, during the 1918 college football season.  The team's head coach was Pat Pasini.

The game against  was rescheduled from September 21 to midweek contest on November 6 and Hiram was added late in the year.

Schedule

References

Case
Case Western Reserve Spartans football seasons
Case Scientists football